The 1934 Virginia Cavaliers football team represented the University of Virginia during the 1934 college football season. The Cavaliers were led by first-year head coach Gus Tebell and played their home games at Scott Stadium in Charlottesville, Virginia. They competed as members of the Southern Conference, finishing with a conference record of 1–4 and a 3–6 record overall.

Schedule

References

Virginia
Virginia Cavaliers football seasons
Virginia Cavaliers football